The 2020 Maine Republican presidential primary took place on March 3, 2020, as one of 14 contests scheduled for Super Tuesday in the Republican Party primaries for the 2020 presidential election. The primary was a closed primary (only open to party members) although unenrolled voters were permitted to enroll in a party at the polls with same day registration.

The primary was held along with a people's veto referendum to reject changes to Maine's vaccination laws.

Results
Incumbent President Donald Trump was the only candidate to qualify for the ballot. His 84% share of the vote was his lowest performance of any state in the primaries. Several town clerks speculated that the high number of blank votes cast was due to Republican voters being more interested in voting in the anti-vaccination people's veto referendum than in the primary.

Results by county

See also
 2020 Maine Democratic presidential primary

References

Republican primary
Maine
Maine Republican primary
Maine Republican caucuses